Kim Min-Chul (born April 4, 1983) is an amateur South Korean Greco-Roman wrestler, who played for the men's welterweight category. He defeated Uzbekistan's Ravshan Ruzikulov for a gold medal in the 66 kg division at the 2006 Asian Games in Doha, Qatar. He also captured a silver medal at the 2005 World Wrestling Championships in Budapest, Hungary, losing out to Bulgaria's Nikolay Gergov in 66 kg tournament. Kim is a member of the wrestling team for Sung Shin Company Sportsclub, and is coached and trained by Kim Sung-Moon.

Kim represented South Korea at the 2008 Summer Olympics in Beijing, where he competed for the men's 66 kg class. Unfortunately, he lost the qualifying round match by a superiority decision to Iran's Ali Mohammadi, with a two-set technical score (1–1, 1–1), and a classification point score of 1–3.

References

External links
Profile – International Wrestling Database
NBC 2008 Olympics profile

South Korean male sport wrestlers
1983 births
Living people
Olympic wrestlers of South Korea
Wrestlers at the 2006 Asian Games
Wrestlers at the 2008 Summer Olympics
Asian Games medalists in wrestling
World Wrestling Championships medalists
Asian Games gold medalists for South Korea
Medalists at the 2006 Asian Games
21st-century South Korean people